USS Canandaigua (IX-233), an unclassified miscellaneous vessel, was the third ship of the United States Navy to be named for Canandaigua, New York.

History
Canadaigua, an auxiliary schooner, was designed by William H. Hand, Jr., and built at East Boothbay, Maine. Her owner in 1942 was Hobart Ford of Norwalk and Bridgeport, Connecticut.  The Coast Guard acquired her later in 1942, designated her CG-81006, and used her on offshore patrol duty in the 3rd Naval District from 2 November 1942 to 30 October 1945.

A Chief of Naval Operations (CNO) dispatch of 20 September 1945 authorized the Commander of the 3rd Naval District to accept CG-81006 from the Coast Guard for permanent transfer to the Navy.  A CNO letter of 9 October 45, approved by the Secretary of the Navy on 15 October 1945, changed the classification of CG-81006 to IX-233 and name her CANANDAIGUA. She was transferred by the Coast Guard on 30 October 1945, was placed in service the next day, and assigned to the Underwater Sound Laboratory at New London, Connecticut. She foundered there on 22 November 1945 due to hull damage inflicted alongside her pier during a northeaster gale and was considered a total loss. She was placed out of service in January 1946 and sold for scrap on 31 October 1946.

References 

Canandaiga
1945 ships
Maritime incidents in November 1945